Conquest is the act of military subjugation of an enemy by force of arms.

Military history provides many  examples of conquest: the Roman conquest of Britain, the Mauryan conquest of Afghanistan and of vast areas of the Indian subcontinent, the Spanish conquest of the Aztec Empire and various Muslim conquests, to mention just a few.

The Norman conquest of England provides an example: it built on cultural ties, led to the subjugation of the Kingdom of England to Norman control and brought William the Conqueror to the English throne in 1066.

Conquest may link in some ways with colonialism. England, for example, experienced phases and areas of  Anglo-Saxon,  Viking and  Franco-Norman colonisation and conquest.

Methods of conquest
The Ottomans used a method of gradual, non-military conquest in which they established suzerainty over their neighbours and then displaced their ruling dynasties.  This concept was first systematized by Halil İnalcık. Conquests of this sort did not involve violent revolution but were a process of slow assimilation, established by bureaucratic means such as registers of population and resources as part of the feudal timar system.

Ancient conquests
The ancient civilized peoples conducted wars on a large scale that were, in effect, conquests. In Egypt the effects of invasion and conquest are to be seen in different racial types represented in paintings and sculptures. 

Improved agriculture production was not conducive to peace; it allowed for specialization which included the formation of ever-larger militaries and improved weapon technology. This, combined with growth of population and political control, meant war became more widespread and destructive. Thus, the Aztecs; Incas; the African Kingdoms Dahomey and Benin; and the ancient civilizations of Egypt, Babylonia, Assyria and Persia all stand out as more militaristic than the less organized societies around them. Military adventures were on a larger scale and effective conquest for the first time became feasible.

Leading to migration
Military conquest has been one of the most persistent causes of human migrations.  There is a significant influence of migration and conquest on political development and state formation.  Conquest leading to migration has contributed to race mixture and cultural exchange.  The latter points influence on conquest has been of far greater significance in the evolution of society.  Conquest brings humans into contact, even though it is a hostile contact.

Plunder
 
Plunder has in all times and places been a result of war, the conquerors taking whatever things of value they find. The desire for it has been one of the most common causes of war and conquest.

The state

In the formation of the modern state, the conspicuous immediate causes are the closely related facts of migration and conquest.  The state has increased civilization and allowed increased cultural contact allowing for a cultural exchange and stimulus; frequently the conquerors have taken over the culture of their subjects.

Subjugation
With subjugation, further class distinctions arise.  The conquered people are enslaved; thus the widest possible social classes are produced: the enslaved and the free.  The slaves are put to work to support the upper classes, who regard war as their chief business.   The state is in origin a product of war and exists primarily as an enforced peace between conquerors and conquered.  From slavery and from conquest, another result of war, sprang differentiation of classes and occupations termed the division of labour. Through conquest, society became divided into a ruling militant class and a subject industrial class.  The regulative function devolved upon the conquering soldiers and operations side to the serfs and slaves.

Culture after conquest
After a conquest where a minority imposes itself on a majority, it usually adopts the language and religion of the majority, through this force of numbers and because a strong government can be maintained only through the unity of these two important facts.  In other cases, especially when the conquerors create or maintain strong cultural or social institutions, the conquered culture could adopt norms or ideas from the conquering culture to expedite interactions with the new ruling class. These changes were often imposed on the conquered people by force, particularly during religiously motivated conquests.

Post-World War II
Scholars have debated the existence of a norm against conquest since 1945. Conquest of large swaths of territory has been rare, but states have since 1945 continued to pursue annexation of small swaths of territory.

See also

Invasion
Right of conquest
Victory

References

Military terminology